Dayal Singh may refer to:
 Dyal Singh Majithia (1848–1898), founder The Tribune and Punjab National Bank
 Shiv Dayal Singh (1818–1878), founder and first spiritual leader of Radha Soami sect